"Breathe" is a song by Scottish singer Midge Ure released on 22 March 1996 as the first single from his album Breathe.

The song was written by Midge Ure and produced by Richard Feldman.

It was made famous by its use in a popular television advertising campaign of the Swatch, two years after its actual publication, which has revived the fortunes of both the commercial track of the disc in which was contained.

The music video sees Midge Ure sing the song next to Westbury White Horse.

Tracks
CD-Maxi Arista (74321 54277 2 (BMG) / EAN 004)
"Breathe" (radio edit) – 4:06
"Breathe" (live) – 3:58

Charts

Weekly charts

Year-end charts

References

1996 singles
Midge Ure songs
Number-one singles in Austria
Number-one singles in Italy
Songs written by Midge Ure
1996 songs
Arista Records singles